Ellen Gwaradzimba (née Munyoro; 25 December 1960 – 15 January 2021) was a Zimbabwean politician who served as Minister of State for Provincial Affairs for the Province of Manicaland.

Gwaradzimba died on January 15, 2021, a victim of COVID-19, in a private hospital in Harare. Gwaradzimba was posthumously declared a National Hero by President Emmerson Mnangagwa.

References

1960 births
2021 deaths
21st-century Zimbabwean politicians
Deaths from the COVID-19 pandemic in Zimbabwe
Members of the Senate of Zimbabwe
People from Manicaland Province
Provincial governors of Zimbabwe
National Heroes of Zimbabwe
ZANU–PF politicians
Zimbabwean politicians